Malta was a Swedish pop duo. It was a duo consisting of Claes af Geijerstam and Göran Fristorp. In 1973, they had to change their band name to Nova in order to perform at the Eurovision Song Contest 1973 to perform the song "You're Summer" in Luxembourg, which would put them in 5th place.

References 

Swedish pop music groups
Eurovision Song Contest entrants for Sweden
Eurovision Song Contest entrants of 1973
EMI Records artists